Alon Pinkas (born 6 August 1961) is an Israeli diplomat and writer.

Early life
Alon Pinkas was born in Tel Aviv and grew up in Rehovot. He graduated summa cum laude in political science from Hebrew University. After his bachelor's he went straight to the United States to do his master's, and he graduated cum laude from Georgetown University with degree in Government and Politics. He is married to Revital. They have two children.

Diplomatic career
Pinkas served as Chief of Staff to Shlomo Ben-Ami and David Levy (Ministers of Foreign Affairs). He was a foreign policy advisor for Ehud Barak and political advisor to Shimon Peres.
From 2000 to 2004, Pinkas served as Consul General of Israel in New York City. He was succeeded as Consul General by Aryeh Mekel. He has also been a foreign affairs analyst for Fox Television.

Some Writing Media
Al-Monitor: Independent,  
Haaretz,  
Jewish Journal,  
Times of Israel

References

1961 births
Living people
Israeli consuls
Israeli political scientists
Georgetown University alumni
Hebrew University of Jerusalem Faculty of Social Sciences alumni
People from Rehovot